Besik Beradze (born 20 February 1968) is a retired Georgian professional football player.

External links
 Career summary

1968 births
Living people
Soviet footballers
Footballers from Georgia (country)
Expatriate footballers from Georgia (country)
Expatriate footballers in Turkey
Expatriate footballers in Russia
Russian Premier League players
Süper Lig players
FC Dinamo Tbilisi players
Trabzonspor footballers
FC Chernomorets Novorossiysk players
Georgia (country) international footballers
Association football defenders